The 1989 Currie Cup Division B (known as the Santam Bank Currie Cup for sponsorship reasons) was the second division of the Currie Cup competition, the 50th season in the since it started in 1889.

Teams

Changes between 1988 and 1989 seasons
  were promoted to Division A.
  were promoted from the Santam Bank Trophy Division A.

Changes between 1989 and 1990 seasons
 Division B was expanded from six to eight teams.
  were promoted to Division A.

Competition

Regular season and title play-offs
There were six participating teams in the 1989 Currie Cup Division B. These teams played each other twice over the course of the season, once at home and once away. Teams received two points for a win and one points for a draw. The top two teams qualified for the Division B finals, played at the home venue of the higher-placed team.

The winner of the final also qualified for the 1989 Currie Cup Semi-Final.

Promotion play-offs
The top team on the log qualified for the promotion play-offs. That team played off against the team placed seventh in Division A over two legs. The winner over these two ties qualified for the 1990 Currie Cup Division A, while the losing team qualified for the 1990 Currie Cup Division B.

Relegation play-offs
The bottom team on the log qualified for the relegation play-offs. That team played off against the team that won the Santam Bank Trophy Division A over two legs. The winner over these two ties qualified for the 1990 Currie Cup Division B, while the losing team qualified for the 1990 Santam Bank Trophy.

Log

Fixtures and results

Round one

Round two

Round three

Round four

Round five

Round six

Round seven

Round eight

Round nine

Round ten

Round eleven

Round twelve

Round thirteen

Final

Currie Cup Semi-Final
As champions of Division B,  qualified to the semi-finals of the main Currie Cup competition, where they met Division A runners-up .

Promotion/relegation play-offs

Promotion play-offs
In the promotion play-offs,  were due to meet , but play-off games were not played. At the end of September 1989, the South African Rugby Board announced that  would not play in the 1990 Currie Cup competition and that  would be automatically promoted. Despite suggestions that  would be allowed back into the Currie Cup, South West Africa later voluntarily withdrew, due to uncertainty arising from Namibia gaining independence.

Relegation play-offs

See also
 1989 Currie Cup Division A
 1989 Santam Bank Trophy Division A
 1989 Santam Bank Trophy Division B
 1989 Lion Cup

References

B
1989